Proruaca is a genus of moths of the family Erebidae. The genus was erected by William Lucas Distant in 1901.

Species
Proruaca harmonica Distant, 1901 South Africa, Malawi, Zimbabwe
Proruaca recurrens Hampson, 1902 Kenya, Tanzania, Mozambique, Botswana, Zambia, Zimbabwe, South Africa, Namibia

References

Calpinae